Bentley Heath is a hamlet in Hertfordshire, England, between Chipping Barnet and Potters Bar. It is on the north edge of the Wrotham Park estate with which it has traditionally been associated. Historically, it was in Middlesex.

The hamlet contains a number of listed buildings:
 Almshouses
 Bentley Heath Farm House and barn
 Elm Farm House
 Holy Trinity, a private chapel for the Wrotham Park estate

References

External links 

 

Hamlets in Hertfordshire
Places formerly in Middlesex